$1,000 a Touchdown is a 1939 American comedy film directed by James P. Hogan, written by Delmer Daves, and starring Joe E. Brown, Martha Raye, Eric Blore, Susan Hayward, John Hartley and Joyce Mathews. It was released on October 4, 1939, by Paramount Pictures.

Plot
Marlowe Booth and his wife Martha inherit a tapped out college and decide to strengthen the college's football team in order to increase funding, so they decide to give 1,000 dollars for each touchdown made.

Cast  

Joe E. Brown as Marlowe Mansfield Booth
Martha Raye as Martha Madison
Eric Blore as Henry
Susan Hayward as Betty McGlen
John Hartley as Bill Anders
Joyce Mathews as Lorelei
George McKay as Mr. Fishbeck
Syd Saylor as Bangs
Tom Dugan as Popcorn vendor
Matt McHugh as Brick Benson
Don Wilson as Announcer
Paula DeCardo as Dora (uncredited)
Dot Farley as Hysterical Girl (uncredited)
Bill Thompson as Animal and Bird Impersonator (uncredited)
Adrian Morris as Two Ton Terry (uncredited)

Reception
Frank Nugent of The New York Times criticized the film as unoriginal.

References

External links 
 

1939 films
1939 comedy films
American black-and-white films
American comedy films
American football films
American sports comedy films
1930s English-language films
Films directed by James Patrick Hogan
Films set in universities and colleges
Paramount Pictures films
1930s American films